Cloverland is an unincorporated community located in the town of Cloverland, Douglas County, Wisconsin, United States.

Wisconsin Highway 13 serves as a main route in the community. Cloverland is located 24 miles east of the city of Superior.

Notes

Unincorporated communities in Douglas County, Wisconsin
Unincorporated communities in Wisconsin